is a 1995 Japanese comedy-drama film directed by Kaneto Shindo. It was the last film of actresses Haruko Sugimura and Nobuko Otowa.

Plot
Yoko Morimoto, an aged but still active widowed actress, takes a rest from rehearsals and the hot temperature in Tokyo in her rural summer residence. Toyoko Yanagawa, her housemaid of many years, tells her that the 83-year-old gardener committed suicide, leaving behind a note which simply said, "it's over". On his self-made coffin, he had placed a heavy stone from the nearby riverbed, to be used for nailing the coffin's lid.

Later, Yoko receives a phone call by Mr. Fujihachiro Ushiguni, who is on a trip with his wife Tomie, an old friend and former theatre troupe colleague of Yoko. Yoko invites them into her house. Tomie is senile and has memory lapses and difficulties to recognise others, but with Yoko's help, she can still recite passages from Chekhov's plays The Seagull and Three Sisters, which they used to perform many years ago.

The next day, an armed man breaks into the house and demands food from the women at gunpoint. Tomie tries to grab his weapon, and moments later, he is arrested by the police. The intruder turns out to be a mentally ill criminal who had attacked residents of an old people's home, driven mad by their incessant playing croquet. Tomie receives a reward for helping to capture the escapee, but when she, her husband, Yoko and Toyoko go out to have lunch in an exclusive restaurant, they are disappointed to find that the envelope she was handed out contains only 10,000 yen rather than the 300,000 yen they had hoped for.

The Ushigunis leave the summer house to continue their journey. After their departure, Toyoko confesses to Yoko that she had an affair with Yoko's husband Saburo while she was on tour 22 years ago, and that Saburo is the father of Toyoko's daughter Akemi. Yoko is indignant at first, and Toyoko leaves the house, but eventually the women settle their dispute. Later, they attend the traditional "tentative marriage" ceremony of Akemi and her future husband Daigoro, a common local man, and watch various stylized costumed dances of sexual rituals.

The next morning, newspaper journalist Naoko visits Yoko's house, telling her that Tomie and her husband committed shinjū in the ocean near Naoetsu, Niigata. Yoko realises that the couple had been on their last journey and that their visit was Tomie's means of saying goodbye. Together with the journalist, Yoko and Toyoko retrace their final steps. Back in her residence, Yoko packs her suitcase to return to Tokyo, instructing Toyoko to keep the gardener's stone for Yoko's coffin in case she should die. After Yoko has left, Toyoko takes the stone to the river and throws it into the water.

Cast
 Haruko Sugimura as Yoko Morimoto
 Nobuko Otowa as Toyoko Yanagawa
 Hideo Kanze as Fujihachiro Ushiguni
 Kyoko Asagiri as Tomie Ushiguni
 Toshiyuki Nagashima as Police Officer
 Mitsuko Baisho as Naoko Yazawa
 Yutaka Matsushige as Daigoro
 Tomomi Seo as Akemi
 Katsumi Kiba as Intruder
 Kōichi Ueda as Chief of Police
 Masahiko Tsugawa as Saburo Morimoto
 Masaaki Uchino as Koji Kiyokawa

Production
The house in the mountains was director Shindō's actual mountain retreat, and is the same building as the old man's house in Tree Without Leaves. Shindō's wife Nobuko Otowa was diagnosed with terminal cancer during the production and died in December 1994, prior to the film's release.

Awards
 1995 Hochi Film Award for Best Film
 1996 Japan Academy Film Prize for Best Film, Best Director, Best Screenplay and Best Supporting Actress (Nobuko Otowa) 
 1996 Blue Ribbon Award for Best Film
 1996 Kinema Junpo Awards for Best Film, Best Director, Best Actress (Haruko Sugimura) and Best Supporting Actress (Nobuko Otowa)
 1996 Mainichi Film Concours for Best Film, Best Director and Best Actress (Haruko Sugimura)

A Last Note was also shown in competition at the 19th Moscow International Film Festival.

References

External links
 
 
 
 
 

1995 films
1995 comedy-drama films
Japanese comedy-drama films
Films directed by Kaneto Shindo
Picture of the Year Japan Academy Prize winners
Best Film Kinema Junpo Award winners
1990s Japanese films